Nervous System is the fifth solo studio album by American rapper David "The Dirtball" Alexander of the Kottonmouth Kings. It was released on March 1, 2011 via Suburban Noize Records. The album features guest appearances from Daddy X and Johnny Richter of KMK, Big B of OPM, and Blaze Ya Dead Homie.

Track listing

Chart history

References

External links 
Dirtball - Nervous System at Bandcamp

2011 albums
Suburban Noize Records albums
Albums produced by Seven (record producer)